Season 2006–07 was the 123rd football season in which Dumbarton competed at a Scottish national level, entering the Scottish Football League for the 101st time, the Scottish Cup for the 112th time, the Scottish League Cup for the 60th time and the Scottish Challenge Cup for the 16th time.

Overview 
It was hoped that the return to the Third Division would be a short one and that Gerry McCabe would be the manager to help Dumbarton win an immediate promotion.  Despite a slow start, by the end of December, Dumbarton were in pole position to claim at least one of the play off places in the league.  However, the end of a successful loan spell for the club's top scorer - Stephen Dobbie - coincided with a slump in form and by the end of March a gap had opened up between the top four and the chasing group.  Despite a run of 5 consecutive wins in April, 5th place would be the best that could be achieved 8 points adrift of East Fife in 4th.

In the Scottish Cup, an excellent away win over Second Division Raith Rovers was rewarded by a third round tie against Celtic.  However it would be the Premier League side that would advance.

In the League Cup, Dumbarton had a decisive win over Second Division Stirling Albion, but it would be another Premier League side, Inverness Caledonian Thistle that would advance after a close fought second round tie.

Finally, it would be 'business as usual' in the League Challenge Cup, with another first hurdle fall, this time to Morton.

Locally, in the Stirlingshire Cup, Dumbarton won one and lost one of their opening group ties, and failed to progress to the final.

Results & fixtures

Scottish Third Division

CIS League Cup

Scottish League Challenge Cup

Scottish Cup

Stirlingshire Cup

Pre-season and mid-season friendlies

League table

Player statistics

Squad 

|}

Transfers

Players in

Players out

Trivia
 The League match against East Stiring on 21 October marked Chris Boyle's 100th appearance for Dumbarton in all national competitions - the 129th Dumbarton player to reach this milestone.
 The League match against Queens Park on 30 December marked Craig Brittain's 300th appearance for Dumbarton in all national competitions - the 7th Dumbarton player to achieve this accolade.

See also
 2006–07 in Scottish football

References

External links
Peter Shaw (Dumbarton Football Club Historical Archive)
Jason McLauchlin (Dumbarton Football Club Historical Archive)
Tommy Coyne (Dumbarton Football Club Historical Archive)
Scottish Football Historical Archive

Dumbarton F.C. seasons
Scottish football clubs 2006–07 season